Parmortha is a genus of parasitoid wasps belonging to the family Ichneumonidae.

The species of this genus are found in Europe, Africa and Northern America.

Species:
 Parmortha circumcincta (Provancher, 1879) 
 Parmortha parvula (Gravenhorst, 1829)

References

Ichneumonidae
Ichneumonidae genera